Horacio Zeballos won in the final of the first edition of these championships. He defeated Carlos Salamanca 7–5, 6–2.

Seeds

Draw

Final four

Top half

Bottom half

Sources
 Main Draw

External links
 Qualifying Draw

Seguros Bolivar Open Bucaramanga - Singles
2009 Singles